Richard Lander School is a coeducational secondary school located in Truro, Cornwall, England. It is named after Richard Lemon Lander.

It is a community school administered by Cornwall Council.

Notable former pupils
Darren Dawidiuk, rugby player with Cornish Pirates and currently Gloucester Rugby
Rob Thirlby, rugby player with Saracens, Bath Rugby, Gloucester Rugby

References

Truro
Secondary schools in Cornwall
Community schools in Cornwall
Educational institutions established in 2006
2006 establishments in England